Angelo Mario Montemurro (April 6, 1893 – April 3, 1983) was a provincial politician from Alberta, Canada. He served as a member of the Legislative Assembly of Alberta from 1952 to 1955, sitting with the Social Credit caucus in government.

References

Alberta Social Credit Party MLAs
Italian emigrants to Canada
People from the Province of Cosenza
1983 deaths
1893 births